The 2009 Tour de Romandie (63rd Edition) cycling road race started on 28 April and finished on 3 May in Switzerland.  It was the 6th event in the 2009 UCI ProTour, and the 12th event in the World Calendar.

Andreas Klöden did not defend the title he won the previous year, but the two previous winners of the event, Thomas Dekker and Cadel Evans took part, as teammates on the  team. Other pre-race favourites included four of the top five in 2008 (Roman Kreuziger, Marco Pinotti, Dennis Menchov and Mikel Astarloza) and 2008 ProTour champion Alejandro Valverde.

Roman Kreuziger won the 4th stage, and in doing so put himself into a lead that he retained on the last day, thus going one better than his second place overall in 2008.

Stages

Prologue – 28 April 2009: Lausanne, (ITT)

Stage 1 – 29 April 2009: Montreux > Fribourg

The stage was shortened due to snowfalls, from a scheduled 176.2 km to 87.6 km.

Stage 2 – April 30, 2009: La Chaux-de-Fonds

Stage 3 – 1 May 2009: Yverdon-les-Bains, (TTT)

Stage 4 – 2 May 2009: Estavayer-le-Lac > Sainte-Croix

Stage 5 – 3 May 2009: Aubonne > Geneva

Final standings

General classification

Sprints classification

Mountain classification

Youth classification

Jersey progress

References

External links

2009
2009 UCI World Ranking
2009 in Swiss sport
2009 UCI ProTour